Raspberry is a color that resembles the color of raspberries.

The first recorded use of raspberry as a color name in English was in 1892.

Variations

French raspberry

At right is displayed the color French raspberry, which is the deep rich tone of raspberry called framboise (French name of the raspberry) in the Pourpre.com color list, a color list widely popular in France.

Raspberry rose

At right is displayed the color raspberry rose.

The color raspberry rose is a deep tone of raspberry.

The first recorded use of raspberry rose as a color name in English was in 1950, in the Descriptive Color Names Dictionary.

The normalized color coordinates for raspberry rose are identical to irresistible, which was first recorded as a color name in English in 1948, in the Plochere Color System.

Raspberry glacé

The color raspberry glacé is displayed at right. It is a medium shade of raspberry that is used in interior design.

The first recorded use of raspberry glacé as a color name in English was in 1926.

The source of this color is the Plochere Color System, a color system formulated in 1948 that is widely used by interior designers.

The normalized color coordinates for raspberry glacé are identical to mauve taupe, first recorded as a color name in English in 1925.

Dark raspberry

At right is displayed the dark tone of raspberry that is called "raspberry" on the Xona Games Color List.

Dark raspberry is a color that resembles the color of a black raspberry.

Dark raspberry is also the color of regular raspberries that have been boiled down into raspberry jam or sauce with sugar to use for cake filling, filling for French pancakes, ice cream topping, etc.

In culture

Music 

 Perhaps the most famous mention of the color raspberry was by Prince, in his popular song, "Raspberry Beret".

Vexillology 

 The color raspberry has been used in Cossack ethnic flags and uniforms.

See also
 RAL 3027 Raspberry red
 List of colors

References

Shades of red